NGC 7080 is a barred spiral galaxy located about 204.5 million light-years away in the constellation of Vulpecula. It has an estimated diameter of about 100,000 light-years which would make it similar in size to the Milky Way.  NGC 7080 was discovered by astronomer Albert Marth on September 6, 1863.

According to Harold Corwin, NGC 7054 is a duplicate observation of NGC 7080.

On December 5, 1998 a supernova of type Ic-pec was discovered in NGC 7080.

See also 
 NGC 1300

References

External links 

Barred spiral galaxies
Vulpecula
7080
11756
66861
Astronomical objects discovered in 1863